Ellen van Neerven (born 1990) is an Aboriginal Australian author, educator and editor. They are queer and non-binary. Their first work of fiction, Heat and Light (2013), won several awards, and in 2019 Van Neerven won the Queensland Premier's Young Publishers and Writers Award. Their second collection of poetry, Throat (2020), won three awards at the 2021 New South Wales Premier's Literary Awards, including Book of the Year.

Early life and education
Van Neerven was born in 1990 to Dutch and Aboriginal parents, and is of the Mununjali clan of the Yugambeh nation. 

They studied creative writing at the Queensland University of Technology.

They are openly queer and non-binary, using they/them pronouns.

Writing career

Van Neerven's first book, Heat and Light, won the 2013 Queensland Literary Awards' David Unaipon Award for unpublished Indigenous writers, the 2016 NSW Premier's Literary Award's Indigenous Writers Prize and was shortlisted for the Stella Prize in 2015.

Their second book, the poetry collection Comfort Food, was published in 2016. One of van Neerven's stories, Confidence Game, was featured in SBS podcast series, True Stories, in 2015.

Throat (2020) is van Neerven's second collection of poems, and consists of five themed chapters: "The haunt-walk in"; "Whiteness is always approaching"; "I can't wait to meet my future genders"; "Speaking outside"; and " Take me to the back of my throat". Throat won three prizes at the New South Wales Premier's Literary Awards: Book of the Year; the Kenneth Slessor Prize for Poetry; and the Multicultural NSW Award.

Van Neerven has also had some of their poetry translated into their grandmother's Yugambeh language by Shaun Davies.

Van Neerven published a piece in Griffith Review about sport, entitled "No Limits", in September 2021. Described as "part creative memoir, part reportage, part theoretical essay and part history lesson", the piece examines the exclusionary nature of sport, which leads to a very low rate of participation by non-binary people.

Other activities

In September 2015, in a collaboration with Poets House in New York, a recording of six First Nations Australia Writers Network (FNAWN) members reading their work was presented at a special event, which was recorded. Van Neerven was one of the readers, along with Jeanine Leane, Dub Leffler, Melissa Lucashenko, Bruce Pascoe, and Jared Thomas.

Van Neerven is co-host and creative producer of two podcasts, Extraordinary Voices for Extraordinary Times, launched in June 2020, and Between the Leaves, launched in October 2020.

Awards and honours 
Van Neerven was a recipient of a Sidney Myer Creative Fellowship, an award of  given to mid-career creatives and thought leaders.
 2013: Queensland Literary Awards — The David Unaipon Award for Unpublished Indigenous Writers for Heat and Light
 2015: Dobbie Literary Award for Heat and Light
 2015: Stella Prize shortlist for Heat and Light
 2015: Sydney Morning Herald Best Young Australian Novelist for Heat and Light
 2016: NSW Premier's Literary Award — Indigenous Writers Prize for Heat and Light
2016: Victorian Premier's Literary Award for Indigenous Writing for Heat and Light
 2017: The poem "Mango" from van Neerven’s collection Comfort Food (2016) was chosen as a sample text in the English Paper 1 examination of the New South Wales Higher School Certificate
 2019: Queensland Literary Awards — Queensland Premier's Young Publishers and Writers Awards — winner
2020: University of Queensland Press' inaugural Quentin Bryce Award for Throat
2020: Queensland Premier's Literary Awards, Judith Wright Calanthe Prize for Poetry: shortlisted for Throat
2021: Victorian Premier's Prize for Poetry: shortlisted for Throat
2021: NSW Premier's Literary Awards Book of the Year; Kenneth Slessor Prize for Poetry; and the Multicultural NSW Award, for Throat
2021: ALS Gold Medal: shortlisted for Throat
2022: Adelaide Festival Awards for Literature John Bray Poetry Award: shortlisted for Throat

Selected works

Fiction
 Heat and light, University of Queensland Press (2014)

Short stories
 Skin, Meanjin Literary Journal
 Wetskins, The Lifted Brow
 S&J, McSweeney's

Poetry

Collections
 Comfort Food, University of Queensland Press (2016)
Throat, University of Queensland Press (2020)
 invisible spears

Poems
 'Invisible Spears', Overland Literary Journal (Issue 220)

As editor

 Writing Black: New Indigenous Writing from Australia, edited by Ellen van Neerven, State Library of Queensland (2014)
Joiner Bay and Other Stories, edited by Ellen van Neerven, Margaret River Press (2017)
Homeland calling : words from a new generation of Aboriginal and Torres Strait Islander voices, edited by Ellen van Neerven,  Desert Pea Media via Hardie Grant Publishing (2020)

Critical studies and reviews

References

External links 
 

Indigenous Australian writers
1990 births
Living people
Australian LGBT poets
Queensland University of Technology alumni
Australian people of Dutch descent
Australian women poets
21st-century Australian poets
21st-century Australian women writers